Cyanella is a genus of cormous perennial herbs native to South Africa and Namibia, first described for modern science in 1754.

Species 
, the World Checklist of Selected Plant Families accepted nine species:
Cyanella alba L.f. - Cape Province
Cyanella aquatica Oberm. ex G.Scott - Calvinia Division of Cape Province
Cyanella cygnea G.Scott - Cape Province
Cyanella hyacinthoides Royen ex L. - Cape Province; naturalized in Western Australia
Cyanella lutea L.f. - Namibia, Cape Province, Free State
Cyanella marlothii J.C.Manning & Goldblatt – Northern Cape Provinces
Cyanella orchidiformis Jacq. - Cape Province
Cyanella pentheri Zahlbr. – Cape Province
Cyanella ramosissima  (Engl. & Krause) Engl. & K.Krause - Namibia, Cape Province

References

Flora of Southern Africa
Asparagales genera